Eric William Stults (born December 9, 1979) is an American former professional baseball pitcher. He pitched for the Los Angeles Dodgers, Colorado Rockies, Chicago White Sox, San Diego Padres and Atlanta Braves in Major League Baseball, and for the Hiroshima Toyo Carp in Nippon Professional Baseball.

College career
Stults played for Bethel College in Mishawaka, Indiana. Stults pitched and played center field for Bethel, which won the 2002 National Christian College Athletic Association Division I championship, posting a 10–1 record that season, and also played basketball at Bethel.

Professional career

Los Angeles Dodgers
Stults was selected by the Los Angeles Dodgers in the 15th round of the 2002 Major League Baseball draft.

In 2002, he pitched for the Vero Beach Dodgers and had a record of 3–1 with an ERA of 3.00 in 13 appearances (6 starts). In 2003, he was 3–4 with a 4.97 ERA in 7 starts for the Jacksonville Suns. In 2004, he pitched for the Columbus Catfish of the South Atlantic League and had a record of 1–2, ERA of 2.49 in 12 appearances. He also pitched in 7 games for Vero Beach that year. In 2005, he alternated between Jacksonville and the Las Vegas 51s, he was 4–3, 3.31 in 12 starts for Jacksonville and 3–7, 6.58 in 14 starts for Las Vegas. In 2006, with Las Vegas he was 10–11 with a 4.23 ERA in 26 starts.

Stults made his Major League Baseball debut with the Dodgers on September 5, 2006, against the Milwaukee Brewers at Miller Park in Milwaukee. He pitched three innings and gave up three earned runs. He earned his first Major League victory on September 10 at Shea Stadium as he held the New York Mets to just one run and two hits over 6.0 innings and 86 pitches, walking two and struck out three in the Dodgers' 9–1 win.

In 2007, he returned to the starting rotation with the Las Vegas 51s. He was called up by the Dodgers to start the game against the Colorado Rockies on August 17, and struck out 9 batters en route to his first victory in 2007 after having thrown 7 innings and giving up only 2 runs, 2 hits, and a walk.

After an inconsistent stay in the majors in 2007, Stults was a long shot to make the Dodgers in spring training 2008 and was sent to Triple-A Las Vegas. He was called up and made his first start with the Dodgers on June 19, 2008, replacing injured Dodger ace Brad Penny in the starting rotation after Penny was placed on the disabled list.

On June 25, 2008, Stults pitched his first Major League shutout, as well as complete game—as the Dodgers blanked the visiting Chicago White Sox, 5–0.

Early in the 2009 season, Stults replaced injured starting pitcher Hiroki Kuroda. He made the best start of his career against the San Francisco Giants on May 9, 2009. At Dodger Stadium Stults threw a complete game shutout, throwing 123 pitches. He struck out 5, walked none, and allowed only four hits.

On May 15, 2009, Stults injured his thumb while making a toss on a bunt attempt by the Florida Marlins' Hanley Ramírez. Stults would make 2 more starts before going on the disabled list. On July 1, Stults was optioned to the AAA Albuquerque Isotopes. He pitched well with the Isotopes, before getting called up to make a spot start on August 9 against the Atlanta Braves. Stults was optioned back to Albuquerque on August 13 and finished the season there.

Hiroshima Toyo Carp

On March 30, 2010 Stults was sold to the Hiroshima Toyo Carp of Nippon Professional Baseball. He was 6–10 with a 5.07 ERA in 21 starts in Japan.

Colorado Rockies
On November 30, 2010 Stults signed a minor league contract with the Colorado Rockies. He had his contract purchased on July 3, 2011. He appeared in six games for Colorado, recording a 6.00 ERA in 12 innings, before being designated for assignment on July 25.

Chicago White Sox
On December 11, 2011, he signed a minor league contract with an invite to spring training. Stults was called up on May 7, 2012. He made two appearances for the White Sox before being designated for assignment on May 15.

San Diego Padres
Stults was claimed off waivers by the San Diego Padres on May 17, 2012, and he made his first start on May 19. Stults went on the disabled list on June 6 with a strained left lat after compiling a 3.19 ERA in four starts, and he returned to the Padres on July 22 after making rehab starts with the Tucson Padres. After pitching out of the bullpen, he rejoined the starting rotation on August 6. He finished the season with an 8–3 record and 2.91 ERA in 20 games and 15 starts.

Stults had 33 starts for the Padres in 2013, going 11-13 with a 3.93 ERA, striking out 131 in 203.2 innings. He led the team in wins, losses, complete games (2), innings pitched and strikeouts. After the season, Stults re-signed with San Diego to a one-year deal worth $2.75 million. Stults was designated for assignment by the Padres on November 3, 2014.

Atlanta Braves
Stults signed a minor league deal with the Atlanta Braves on January 29, 2015. The team announced that Stults had made the Opening Day roster on April 4. Stults struggled to a 1–4 record and 5.36 ERA before he was replaced in the rotation by Williams Pérez on May 20. Due to Alex Wood's illness, Stults made one final start for the team just two days later against the Milwaukee Brewers. He pitched  innings, yielding three hits, five walks, and seven runs.

Return to Los Angeles Dodgers
On May 27, 2015, he was traded to the Los Angeles Dodgers (with Alberto Callaspo, Ian Thomas and Juan Jaime) in exchange for Juan Uribe and Chris Withrow. The Dodgers promptly designated him for assignment. He cleared waivers and accepted an outright assignment to the Double-A Tulsa Drillers. He made eight starts (and two relief appearances) for Tulsa and six starts for the AAA Oklahoma City Dodgers and was 6–5 with a 3.30 ERA.

Pitching style
Stults threw three pitches regularly and two infrequently. His most common pitch was a four-seam fastball averaging about 87-90 mph, followed by a changeup (79–81) and slider (80–84). Less commonly, he threw a slow curveball (average about 70 mph), and rarely, a two-seam fastball. To right-handers, Stults mainly threw a combination of fastballs and changeups, with occasional sliders.  When facing left-handers, he replaced the slider with a changeup.

Personal life
He and his wife Stephanie have two daughters, Madeline and Hallie, and a son, Luke.

References

External links

Minor League Stats

1979 births
Living people
Albuquerque Isotopes players
American expatriate baseball players in Japan
Atlanta Braves players
Baseball players from Indiana
Bethel Pilots baseball players
Charlotte Knights players
Colorado Rockies players
Colorado Springs Sky Sox players
Columbus Catfish players
Chicago White Sox players
Great Falls Dodgers players
Hiroshima Toyo Carp players
Inland Empire 66ers of San Bernardino players
Jacksonville Suns players
Las Vegas 51s players
Los Angeles Dodgers players
Major League Baseball pitchers
People from Argos, Indiana
People from Plymouth, Indiana
San Diego Padres players
Scottsdale Scorpions players
Tucson Padres players
Venados de Mazatlán players
American expatriate baseball players in Mexico
Vero Beach Dodgers players
Tulsa Drillers players
Oklahoma City Dodgers players